Mohd Zama Khan is an Indian politician from Kaimur Bihar. He is a member of Bihar Legislative Assembly. He won from Chainpur  on a Bahujan Samaj Party ticket by the Margin of nearly 35,000 votes in 2020 Bihar Legislative Assembly election. Later he Switched to Janata Dal (United) and became the minister of Minority Affairs in Seventh Nitish Kumar ministry.

References 

Year of birth missing (living people)
Living people
Bahujan Samaj Party politicians
Janata Dal (United) politicians
Indian National Congress politicians from Bihar
Bihar MLAs 2020–2025
People from Kaimur district